Aaron Bidois is a paralympic swimmer from New Zealand competing mainly in category SB6 events.

Bidois competed in two Paralympics, firstly in 1992 and then again in 1996.  In 1992 he left medalless after finishing fourth in the heat of the 100m backstroke, fifth in the final of the breaststroke, fifth in his heat of the 100m freestyle, 200m medley and 50m freestyle. In 1996 he was seventeenth in the 50m freestyle heats, fifteenth in the 100m freestyle heats, fourth in the 200m medley final and won a silver medal in the 100m breaststroke.

Bidois also represented New Zealand at the 1994 Commonwealth Games in Victoria, Canada. He swam in the 100 m freestyle S9, recording a time of 1:10.62 in his heat, and not progressing to the final.

References

External links 
 
 
 

Paralympic swimmers of New Zealand
Swimmers at the 1996 Summer Paralympics
Paralympic silver medalists for New Zealand
New Zealand male breaststroke swimmers
Living people
Year of birth missing (living people)
Medalists at the 1996 Summer Paralympics
Swimmers at the 1994 Commonwealth Games
Commonwealth Games competitors for New Zealand
Paralympic medalists in swimming